The Estonian Basketball Association is the governing body of basketball in Estonia. It was founded in 1923, and joined FIBA in 1934. After 1940 though, they suspended operations due to being occupied by the Soviet Union.

The Estonian Basketball Association operates the Estonian men's national team and Estonian women's national team. They organize national competitions throughout Estonia, for both the men's and women's senior teams and also the youth national basketball teams.

The top professional league in Estonia is the Korvpalli Meistriliiga.

Presidents

 1989–1993 Aadu Kana
 1993–2000 Priit Vilba
 2000–2012 Peep Aaviksoo
 2012–2016 Jüri Ratas
 2016–2020 Jaak Salumets
 17.12.2020– Priit Sarapuu

See also 
Estonia national basketball team
Estonia women's national basketball team

References

External links 
Official website 
Estonia at Facebook.com
Estonia at FIBA site

Basketball in Estonia
Basketball
Fed
Basketball governing bodies in Europe
Sports organizations established in 1923